Wushu may refer to:

Martial arts
 Chinese martial arts, the various martial arts of China
 Wushu (sport), a modern exhibition of traditional Chinese martial arts
 Wushu stances, five key stances utilized in both contemporary wushu and traditional wushu

Other topics
 Chinese shamanism or wushu
 Wushu Township, Wan'an County, Jiangxi, China
 Wushu, the Mandarin Chinese title of the 1993 Hong Kong film Run and Kill
 Wushu or "Five Rats", major characters in the Chinese novel The Seven Heroes and Five Gallants

See also
 Wuzhu (died 1148), prince and general of the Jin dynasty
 Age of Wushu, a 2012 free-to-play 3D martial arts video game
 Wushu in Singapore